Andronymus hero, the scarce dart, is a butterfly in the family Hesperiidae. It is found in Guinea, Sierra Leone, Liberia, Ivory Coast, Ghana, Nigeria, Cameroon, Gabon, the Republic of the Congo, the Central African Republic, Angola, the Democratic Republic of the Congo, western Tanzania and north-western and north-eastern Zambia. The habitat consists of forests.

The larvae feed on Combretum cuspidum, Anthonota macrophylla and Anthonota crassifolia.

References

Butterflies described in 1937
Erionotini